Sergey Kopytov (born 5 October 1965) is a Kazakhstani weightlifter. He competed in the men's heavyweight I event at the 1996 Summer Olympics.

References

1965 births
Living people
Sportspeople from Kokshetau
Kazakhstani male weightlifters
Olympic weightlifters of Kazakhstan
Weightlifters at the 1996 Summer Olympics
Weightlifters at the 1994 Asian Games
Weightlifters at the 1998 Asian Games
Asian Games gold medalists for Kazakhstan
Asian Games medalists in weightlifting
Medalists at the 1994 Asian Games
World Weightlifting Championships medalists
20th-century Kazakhstani people
21st-century Kazakhstani people